An icon case or kiot (Russian: киот, Ukrainian: кіот, Greek: προσκυνητάρι) is a decorated case (usually foldable) or glass shelf for keeping and displaying religious icons.

Etymology 
The East Slavic form kiot, sometimes used in English, derives from the Greek κῑβωτός, "box, ark". The usual word in Greek, however, is προσκυνητάρι, from προσκυνητής, "pilgrim", referring to the carrying of icons in cases or stands by pilgrims.

Design

Icon cases vary in size and in design. Common Greek kiots are tall and typically made of carved wood.  They can be ornate or simple. They resemble windows with a roof or dome on top, and therefore support the Eastern Orthodox Church theology which regards icons as "windows into heaven". The icon usually is placed vertically rather than at an angle (as on an analogion). Sometimes there may be a secondary icon on a slanted shelf below the main icon. Some Greek kiots also have a step or platform so that veneration of the icon is easier.

Often parishes with a kiot will place their patron saint, or the patron saint of the city in the kiot. Larger cathedrals may have many kiots set up around the nave. Some large Greek cathedrals feature kiots placed against a wall - resembling an iconostasis - with multiple saints on them.

Additionally, some kiots may also contain a special place in front of the icon for the faithful to place beeswax candles. They may also have a votive hanging in front of the icon itself.

See also
 Analogion
 Iconostasis
 Icon corner

Notes 

Eastern Orthodox icons
Eastern Christian liturgical objects